Albreht is a surname. Notable people with the surname include:

Fran Albreht (1889–1963), Slovenian poet, editor, politician and partisan
Janez Albreht (1925–2013), Slovenian actor
Janez Albreht (ice hockey) (born 1940), Yugoslav ice hockey player
Vera Albreht (1895–1971), Slovenian poet, writer, journalist, and translator